is a passenger railway station in the city of Ichihara, Chiba, Japan, operated by the Keisei Electric Railway.

Lines
Chiharadai Station is a terminus of the Keisei Chihara Line, and is located 10.9 km from the opposing terminus of the line at Chiba-Chūō Station.

Station layout
Chiharadai Station has a single island platform located in a cutting, with the ground-level station built overhead. The station is staffed.

Platforms

History
Chiharadai Station opened on 1 April 1995.

Station numbering was introduced to all Keisei Line stations on 17 July 2010. Chiharadai was assigned station number KS65.

Passenger statistics
In fiscal 2019, the station was used by an average of 5948 passengers daily.

Surrounding area
 Ichihara City Hall Chiharadai Branch
 Kusakari Community Center
 Teikyo Heisei University Chiharadai Campus 
 Tachiharadai Nishi Junior High School
 Chiharadaiminami Junior High School
 Minami Junior High School

See also
 List of railway stations in Japan

References

External links

 Keisei Railway home page 

Railway stations in Japan opened in 1995
Railway stations in Chiba Prefecture
Ichihara, Chiba